Shurcheh (also Romanized as Shūrcheh; also known as Shurchen) is a village in Dughayi Rural District, in the Central District of Quchan County, Razavi Khorasan Province, Iran. At the 2006 census, its population was 396, in 103 families.

References 

Populated places in Quchan County